Blazing Angels 2: Secret Missions of WWII (also known as Blazing Angels 2: Secret Missions) is a 2007 flight combat video game for Microsoft Windows, PlayStation 3, and Xbox 360, developed by Ubisoft Bucharest and published by Ubisoft. A sequel of Blazing Angels: Squadrons of WWII, the game puts the player in an elite Allied squadron trying to prevent Nazi Germany from creating a weapon of mass destruction. As the player progresses, they will travel around the world and battle the enemy with a list of prototype fighter aircraft and upgrades. Multiplayer mode includes deathmatch, cooperative, capture the flag, and epic battle.

Plot
The game begins with the player taking control of Captain Robinson (the protagonist) during an airshow sometime after World War II. After performing several stunts, Robinson begins to narrate the events of his squadron. The game immediately flashbacks to a German attack on an RAF airfield, which the player must defend against. Robinson's first squadron mate, Teach, is introduced here. The two then fly to France and drop off an Allied agent, Marguerite, on a train. They then proceed to destroy numerous ground and air units before leaving. The two then link up with a carrier about to launch an attack on the Italian fleet at Taranto. During the attack, Robinson manages to convince an old acquaintance of his, Milo, to join the squad. The squadron is completed when they fly to Cairo and receive a fighter jockey named Thorpe.

The four pilots repel a massive bombing wave and subsequent aerial assault. They then destroy a German Zeppelin attempting to sneak away. During the interrogation of a downed pilot, Robinson finds out that Marguerite's cover has been blown. In Paris, Marguerite discovers this also through a childhood friend of hers, Max, who is also a German officer. While Marguerite stole some documents from the garrison, Robinson, flying alone, stealthily shot down several German fighters. When Marguerite was exposed, he eliminated roadblocks and attackers until she abandoned the car on the Champs-Élysées. Robinson landed next to her, and flew her out of Paris. The squadron reformed in Russia, where they assist in the capture of a German airbase. Robinson and Teach land and steal a German bomber in order to capture its bombsite. While exfiltrating they bombed two bridges in order to cover the escape of Marguerite and the Russian ground troops.

The bomber is flown to Sweden, where Robinson and Milo tested a new defensive weapon. While testing, they received a radio transmission from Marguerite and discover that her submarine was attacked and is badly damaged. While Milo flew back to notify the other pilots, Robinson located the sub by tracking its transmissions. German fighters soon arrived, though, forcing Robinson to lure them away from the sub and through the icebergs, where he would blind them with his defensive weapon and let them crash. Eventually, the rest of the squadron arrived and assisted in the downing of the remaining fighters. The squadron was then ordered to Moscow in order to help defend it against an impending attack. The squadron helped shoot down German bombers, destroy advancing armor, and direct Katyusha rocket barrages. Soon after, they discovered a massive "Dora gun" protected by an armored dome. When the gun fired, the pilots fired through the open doors and destroyed the gun.

The squadron then linked up with the Flying Tigers and assaulted a hidden airbase in China. Robinson and Milo both landed at the base and stole two prototype planes. They flew the planes on the deck through the nearby canyon in order to avoid AA fire, and then assisted with the escape of the remaining participants. Low on fuel, the squadron flew the planes to Rangoon, making it right as the Japanese began their invasion of the city. Robinson was the only pilot able to get into a different plane and take off in time. He quickly dispatched the bombers attacking the airfield, allowing his squadron mates to take off. The pilots then shot down numerous attacking bombers and sunk several enemy ships that were attacking the evacuation fleet. They flew where needed, destroying artillery positions, bridges, and oil refineries. Robinson and Teach flew to protect an evacuation train while Milo and Thorpe flew to protect the evacuation ships. Both the train and ships escaped, but Thorpe was shot down and captured. Robinson, Teach, Milo, and Marguerite flew a rescue mission, sinking several ships escorting the "hellship" that was holding several POW's (including Thorpe). Robinson then destroyed the gun towers and cargo hatch on the ship while Teach and Milo covered him from enemy fighters. Robinson then destroyed an accidentally launched torpedo, and Thorpe was rescued by an American submarine. While detained, Thorpe learned of an impending attack on San Francisco.

The squadron flew to the city and protected the Golden Gate Bridge and naval port from U-boats launching V-1 rockets. They then shot down several Japanese suicide rockets launched from a carrier submarine. When the rockets turned to attack the squadron, they forced them to crash into the carrier sub, eventually sinking it. They then flew to the Himalayas and intercepted an aerial convoy. Teach, Milo, and Thorpe hijacked a transport plane loaded with secret weapons while Robinson flew cover. Marguerite, though, was captured in the attack and her troops shot. While detained, Max managed to sneak her a weapon, allowing her to take over a train that she was being transported on. He also sent the squadron a message to apprise them of the situation.

The four pilots responded and discovered Max strafing German troops. The five pilots protected Marguerite from numerous roadblocks, enemy fighters, and an armored pursuit train until she crossed the border. Having betrayed Germany, Max joined up with the others. Robinson and Max then flew to Rome, providing air cover for Marguerite while she and her troops stole some documents before the General of the Luftwaffe, General Von Kluge (the primary antagonist) could get them. They learn of a German scientist who wants to defect, and stage a rescue. Robinson first destroys the radar picket stations, and then leads a diversionary attack with Max, Teach and Thorpe while Milo lands on the lake and dispatches Marguerite to rescue the scientist. It is soon revealed to be a trap, however, and the pilots must cover Marguerite's escape back to the lake. Though she makes it, an aerial dreadnaught, a massive plane equipped with a Tesla coil, appears and destroys Milo's plane. Max attempted a run on it, but was quickly dispatched.

The other pilots force the plane down by disabling two of its engines, allowing Milo to take it over. The pilots protect the plane from attack and escape. Max is captured and killed by German troops. The squadron then flies to a remote island and provide air cover while Marguerite sails to shore and then reaches the inner complex. While she attempts to destroy the facility, the squadron must intercept and shoot down V-2 rockets being launched. They manage to stop the first wave and Marguerite has discovered how to destroy the facility, but she is out of demo charges and her men have all been killed. Despite Robinson's protests, she orders him to fire on the fuel tanks inside the facility, something that would probably kill her. Robinson complies, and Marguerite manages to survive the explosion.

The squadron's final mission is to escort a massive flight of Lancaster bombers as they go to destroy a larger version of Von Kluge's Tesla weapon. Though the bombers manage to annihilate the outer defenses, the entire flight is wiped out by the Tesla weapon, as they could not get high enough to avoid the blast. In order to destroy the weapon, the squadron eliminated the ground defenses around each tower. Marguerite would then blow open the doors to the tunnels housing the generators. Robinson flew into each tunnel and destroyed the generators. After finishing off the last one, the squadron encounters Von Kluge in a carrier plane. The plane is protected by a "lightning shield", which would only open in order to launch new fighters. The squadron manages to destroy the enemy fighters and eventually the carrier plane, killing General Von Kluge. The squadron returns home and is disbanded. While Teach and Thorpe have a night on the town in London, Robinson offers to take Marguerite around the world.

Gameplay
While certain missions require specific planes, the player can choose which plane to fly.

Reception

The game received "average" reviews on all platforms according to the review aggregation website Metacritic. In Japan, Famitsu gave these console versions a score of one seven, one eight, one seven, and one eight for a total of 30 out of 40.

References

External links
Official website

2007 video games
World War II video games
PlayStation 3 games
Xbox 360 games
Windows games
Video games scored by Jason Graves
Video games developed in Romania
Video games set in Austria
Video games set in China
Video games set in Egypt
Video games set in Germany
Video games set in France
Video games set in India
Video games set in Indonesia
Video games set in Italy
Video games set in Myanmar
Video games set in Paris
Video games set in Russia
Video games set in San Francisco
Video games set in the Soviet Union
Video games set in Sweden
Video games set in Switzerland
Ubisoft games
Alternate history video games
Multiplayer and single-player video games
Pacific War video games